Carl Byker is the founder of Red Hill Productions and an American television producer, writer, and director. He has written, directed and produced multiple hours for the PBS series Frontline and American Experience." He has also made 12 limited series and science specials for PBS. Among his awards are the 1997 Prime-Time Emmy Award (shared with Blaine Baggett and Jay Winter) for The Great War and the Shaping of the 20th Century in the category of Outstanding Informational Series, the Peabody Award, two Alfred I. duPont–Columbia University Award silver batons, two International Documentary Association awards for best limited series, the Investigative Reporters and Editors award for best multi-platform’ project of the year for a collaboration with NPR, Pro Publica and Frontline.  Carl’s films have also been nominated six times by the Writers Guild of America for best non-fiction television script of the year and have won the award twice.

Personal life  
Carl grew up near Grand Rapids, MI. He went to film school at Montana State University in Bozeman, where he won the American Cinema Editors award as best student editor in the nation. He now lives in Los Angeles with his wife Sue Horton, an editor at the Los Angeles Times. His son Sam Byker is CEO of Atticus.

Filmography 
The Human Quest (1994)
 
The Great War and the Shaping of the 20th Century (1997)
 
The Tree of Life (1999)
 
American Experience: The Duel (2000)
 
American Experience: Woodrow Wilson (2002)
 
Kingdom of David (2003)
 
The New Heroes (2004)
 
Frontline: The Meth Epidemic (2005)
 
Uncommon Heroes (2006)
 
Andrew Jackson: Good, Evil and The Presidency (2008)
 
When Worlds Collide (2010)
 
Frontline:  Post Mortem: Death Investigation in America (2011)
 
Frontline: Money and March Madness (2012) 

Frontline:  Dollars and Dentists (2013)
 
Frontline:  Life & Death in Assisted Living (2015)
 
Hacking Your Mind (2020)

References

External links
 
 Hacking Your Mind/PBS
 Frontline: Life and Death in Assisted Living

Year of birth missing (living people)
Living people
American television producers
American television writers
American male television writers
American television directors
Emmy Award winners